Alan Blenkinsop (born 17 January 1933) is a South African cricketer. He played in nine first-class matches from 1951/52 to 1956/57.

References

External links
 

1933 births
Living people
South African cricketers
Eastern Province cricketers
Free State cricketers
Cricketers from Port Elizabeth